Paul Lambert is an English visual effects supervisor at Wylie Co. He has won three Academy Awards for Best Visual Effects: one for the 2017 film Blade Runner 2049 at the 90th Academy Awards, one for the 2018 film First Man at the 91st Academy Awards., and his recent one in 2022, at the 94th Academy Awards, for his work on Dune.

Selected filmography
 Dune (2021)
 First Man (2018)
 Blade Runner 2049 (2017)
 The Huntsman: Winter's War (2015)
 Gone Girl (2014)
 Jack the Giant Slayer (2013)
 Oblivion (2013)
 The Girl with the Dragon Tattoo (2011)
 Tron: Legacy (2010)
 G.I. Joe: The Rise of Cobra (2009)
 The Curious Case of Benjamin Button (2008)
 Pirates of the Caribbean: At World's End (2007)
 Flags of Our Fathers (2006)
 Letters from Iwo Jima (2006)
 Stealth (2005)
 The Day After Tomorrow (2004)
 Lara Croft: Tomb Raider – The Cradle of Life (2003)

Accolades

References

External links

Visual effects supervisors
Living people
Year of birth missing (living people)
Place of birth missing (living people)
Best Visual Effects Academy Award winners
Best Visual Effects BAFTA Award winners